Welding Shipyards was founded by American shipping businessman, Daniel K. Ludwig (1897–1992) in 1940 at Norfolk, Virginia on the Sewell's Point peninsula. Welding Shipyards build T3 tanker ships for World War II under the Emergency Shipbuilding Program. Welding Shipyards had one construction berth with 600 workers. The shipyard built what Ludwig was known for Oil tankers. Welding Shipyards built five type T3-S-BF1 tankers, the largest at the time. Ludwig' Welding Shipyards used what is called block construction. To shorten keel to ship launching time due losses to German U-boats, block construction was used. Ships blocks were built as the keel was being laid and then the prefabricated parts were then put in place and welded. With this construction time was reduced dramatically. Welding Shipyards and Ludwig had an important role in this new type of construction.
All of the tanker ships were operated by Ludwig's shipping company that he founded, the National Bulk Carriers in 1936 in New York. National Bulk Carriers owned and operated oil tanker ships and bulk carriers. Some of the ships were among the largest in the world at that time. In 1953 Ludwig moved the shipyard operated to the Kure shipyard in Japan. Ludwig leased the Japanese navy Kure yard for 10 years (1950 to 1960). The Welding Shipyards site today is part of the Naval Station Norfolk.   In 1940 and early 1941, Welding Shipyards converted older World War I surplus cargo ships into oil tankers.

Ships built
Ships built at Welding Shipyards: (To save money some of the ships had used reconditioned engines).

T3-S-BF1
T3-S-BF1 had a crew of 50 civilians and 31 United States Navy Armed Guard to man the deck guns and radio. Ships armament had: 1 × 5-inch gun, 1 × 3-inch/50-caliber gun and Oerlikon 20 mm cannon.  T3-S-BF1 had two steam turbines, a single screw with 7,700 shp, top speed of 14 kn (26 km/h), was 515.9 feet long with a beam of 70 feet, was 11,016 tons and held up to 140,000 bbl.

The T3-S-BZ1
The first T3-S-BZ1, SS Phoenix  was constructed in just 76 days keel to launching and 24 days to completion. The ships were 556 feet long, 80 foot beam, 14,160 gross tonnage, deadweight capacity 23,600 tons and with a barrel capacity off 217,000. T3-S-BZ1 had high pressure turbines with double reduction gears for 13,400 shp, to a single propeller with a top speed of 17 knots.

Notable incident
 USS Pan Pennsylvania, a Type T3-S-BF1 tanker, on 16 April 1944 was sunk off Nantucket by a torpedo from U-boat  commanded by Klaus Hänert. She had a crew of 50 men and 31 members of the Naval Armed Guard. The 28 merchant ships of CU-21 were accompanied by Escort Flotilla 21.5, which consisted of six destroyer escorts.

See also
History of the oil tanker

External links
 Ships built by National Bulk Carriers

.

References

1940 establishments in Virginia
Defunct shipbuilding companies of the United States